Jason Smilovic is an American writer and executive producer, as well as the creator of the television series Karen Sisco, Kidnapped, My Own Worst Enemy,  and Condor. He also wrote the film Lucky Number Slevin. Smilovic graduated from the University of Maryland with a degree in political theory and philosophy. He has worked frequently with director-producer Michael Dinner. His production company is Dark & Stormy Entertainment, which in 2007, signed a deal with Universal.

Filmography

Films

Television

Personal life
Smilovic is Jewish.

References

External links

20th-century American Jews
American male screenwriters
American television producers
Living people
1975 births
21st-century American Jews